The Roman Catholic Archbishop of Lipa is the head of the Roman Catholic Archdiocese of Lipa and the Metropolitan Bishop of the suffragan dioceses of Boac, Gumaca, Lucena and the Prelature of Infanta.

The most recent Archbishop was Ramon Arguelles.  He was ordained bishop on Jan. 6, 1994. On May 14, 2004, he was appointed Archbishop of Lipa.  Pope Francis accepted Arguelles' letter of resignation on February 2, 2017 and decided to name Bishop of Daet Gilbert Garcera as the eventual successor.

History
When the original Diocese of Lipa was created on April 10, 1910, the Bishop of Lipa had authority over a very vast region of a mostly homogenous Tagalog population. The Bishop used to oversee the Roman Catholics in the provinces of Batangas, Laguna, Quezon, Marinduque and Mindoro.

In 1936, the first territorial re-organisation of the Roman Catholic Archdiocese of Lipa was promulgated with the creation of the Apostolic Prelature of Calapan, thus separating the province of Mindoro from the Archdiocese. This was followed by the creation of the Diocese of Lucena and the Prelature of Infanta in 1950.

Another re-organisation happened in 1967 when the province of Laguna was raised to the rank of a diocese under the titular Diocese of San Pablo. The Diocese of Boac in Marinduque was created in 1977 and that of Gumaca in 1984. Both dioceses were part of the Diocese of Lucena before their establishment. In 1983 the new Apostolic Vicariate of San Jose in Occidental Mindoro was created.

Today the Archdiocese of Lipa is for the province of Batangas alone. But the population has multiplied many times over. The archdiocese is divided into 6 vicariates, each headed by a vicar forane . Except for the parishes in Vicariate IV which are run by the Oblates of St. Joseph, all other parishes are run by the diocesan clergy. There are 49 parishes in all, served by 143 priests. 122 of them diocesan. There are 13 religious brothers, and 197 religious sisters. Catholic schools number 23, high school seminaries 2 and college seminaries 3. Two pastoral centers are being maintained.

Past and Present Prelates of Lipa

References

Lipa
Christian organizations established in 1910
Roman Catholic dioceses and prelatures established in the 20th century